Placoma or Plakoma was a town of ancient Lycia.

Its site was located near modern Çağman in Asiatic Turkey.

References

Populated places in ancient Lycia
Former populated places in Turkey